Mercer Street is a street in the New York City borough of Manhattan. It runs north to south through Greenwich Village and SoHo neighborhoods, from East 8th Street past West Houston Street to Canal Street. The street was previously called First Street and Clermont Street, but was renamed in 1799 for Hugh Mercer, a Scottish-American brigadier general who died at the Battle of Princeton, which came about due to his advice to George Washington to march on Princeton. Its coordinates are

In popular culture 
 Mercer Street is mentioned in the 1997 song "Anybody Seen My Baby?" from the Rolling Stones
 The naming of Mercer Street was referenced in the 2015 Broadway musical Hamilton, in the song "The Room Where It Happens", during an exchange between Alexander Hamilton and Aaron Burr.

References

External links

Streets in Manhattan
SoHo, Manhattan